Stephen Huss and Ross Hutchins were the defending champions but decided not to participate. However Huss chose not to compete and Hutchins teamed up with Colin Fleming. The French pair formed by Nicolas Mahut and Édouard Roger-Vasselin beat in the final the 3rd seeded Paul Hanley and Jamie Murray with the score 6–4, 7–6(7–4).

Seeds

Draw

Draw

References 
General

Specific

Doubles